Seyi Joseph Adisa (born 7 November 1983) is a Nigerian public administrator and speaker, a lawyer, entrepreneur, and politician. He is a former Principal Private Secretary to the Executive Governor of Oyo State, Senator Abiola Ajimobi. Currently, he is the Honourable Member representing Afijio state constituency of Oyo state in the Oyo State House of Assembly. He is a member of the All Progressives Congress.

Early life and education 
Seyi Adisa was born on 7 November, 1983 in Lagos to Chief Ebenezer Babatunde Adisa and his wife. He began his early education at St. Leo's Nursery and Primary School, Ikeja, Lagos. He then proceeded to the prestigious King's College, Lagos, for his secondary school education. He underwent his A Level studies at Lambeth College where he studied law politics and business and finished with excellent grades. Seyi then proceeded to get a law degree from the University of Birmingham.

He is also a graduate of The BPP Law School where he obtained a distinction in his Legal Practice Course (LPC). Moving back to home, he enrolled at the Nigerian Law School where graduated with second class upper. He furthered his professional development by self studying for the Institute of Chartered Secretary and Administrators Course and won the National Award for best student in Corporate Secretaryship To complement his role as a public servant, Seyi Adisa recently secured a master's degree in Public Administration also from the University of Birmingham.

Furthermore, he has attended several trainings, prominent of which is the Harvard's Continuing Education Modules where he took the Fundamental of Strategy course.

Career & experience 
He is a founding partner of T&A Legal, a commercial law firm which he grew from 2 to 17 lawyers and 3 offices within 8 years. In charge of the commercial department, Seyi grew the clientele base to include not just start-ups but also blue-chip companies, multinationals and government agencies. Before starting T&A, he worked for at the Adepetun Caxton-Martins Agbor & Segun firm, in the Energy (Oil & Gas) and Project Finance Department, where he was actively involved in several commercial transactions including Mergers & Acquisitions, drafting of several commercial agreements including Joint Venture Agreements, Oil Mining Leases and complex property agreements.

Personal life 
Seyi Adisa is married to Tolu Adisa with whom he has a daughter. When he is not at work, he is an avid reader who loves leadership and entrepreneurship literature. He loves football, he is an Arsenal F.C. supporter and an English FA Level 1 coach.

Politics 
He was Vice President of the African-Caribbean Society in the University of Birmingham, and was the Principal Private Secretary to the Governor.

Seyi Adisa declared his interest to run as the House of Assembly representative for the Afijio state constituency, Oyo state, in early 2018. He secured his party ticket after a fiercely contested race with other candidates. At about 5:45 am on the morning of 10 March 2019, Seyi Adisa was declared honorable member-elect and returned winner of the state house of assembly race for Afijio LGA by the Independent National Electoral Commission (INEC). His brand of politics and unusual style of political campaign was seen as a breath of fresh air. His campaign tagline “EJEKASEYI”, translated as “Let's do this together.”

References 

Living people
21st-century Nigerian lawyers
Oyo State politicians
1983 births